U.S. Route 76 (US 76) is a  east–west U.S. highway in the U.S. state of Georgia. It begins at the Tennessee state line, east of Lakeview, Georgia (and in East Ridge, Tennessee), where the roadway continues concurrent with US-41/SR-8 toward Chattanooga. It ends at the South Carolina state line, where US 76 continues toward Anderson. In Georgia, the highway travels within portions of Catoosa, Whitfield, Murray, Gilmer, Fannin, Union, Towns, and Rabun counties. It travels through North Georgia and connects Ringgold, Dalton, Chatsworth, Ellijay, Blue Ridge, Blairsville, and Clayton. Most of the highway is part of the Lookout Mountain Scenic Highway, a highway that travels through northern Georgia and through the Chattahoochee-Oconee National Forest.

Route description

US 76 traverses the northern part of the state and passes through the Chattahoochee-Oconee National Forest and  Georgia's most mountainous region. US 76 passes through Catoosa, Whitfield, Murray, Gilmer, Fannin, Union, Towns, and Rabun counties.

The following portions of US 76 in Georgia are part of the National Highway System, a system of routes determined to be the most important for the nation's economy, mobility, and defense:
From I-75 southeast of Ringgold to about Tunnel Hill
From I-75 in the northwestern part of Dalton to the eastern end of the US 23/US 441 concurrency in Clayton. This includes the entire length of SR 282, which is completely concurrent with US 76 from an intersection with US 411/SR 61 and the southern terminus of Smyrna–Ramhurst Road East in Ramhurst to an intersection with SR 5/SR 515 and the northern terminus of First Avenue in East Ellijay.

History

1920s
The road that would eventually be designated as US 76 was established at least as early as 1919 as part of SR 3 from the Tennessee state line to Dalton, and SR 2 from Dalton to Clayton, and possibly farther to the east. Georgia's 1921 state map didn't show the Chatsworth–Blairsville segment of SR 2. However, it did show SR 2 on a proposed path from Clayton to Pine Mountain. It also showed SR 65 proposed along the current path of SR 28 from Pine Mountain to the South Carolina state line. By the end of 1926, SR 2 was paved from Blue Ridge to a point about halfway between there and Blairsville. Also, the proposed section, east of Clayton, was removed from the map

1930s
By the beginning of 1932, SR 3 was paved from the Tennessee state line to Dalton. US 41 was established along this segment. SR 2 was paved from Blairsville to Hiawassee. SR 2 was built from Chatsworth to Ellijay. SR 5 was designated along the Ellijay–Blue Ridge segment. In January, SR 2/SR 5 were paved from about Cherry Log to Blue Ridge. By August, SR 2 was built from Clayton to the South Carolina state line on its current alignment. By January 1935, US 76 was designated along SR 2 from Chatsworth to Blairsville and from just east of Hiawassee to Clayton. It is unclear if US 76 was designated between Blairsville and the Hiawassee area or east of Clayton. Between July and October, US 76/SR 2/SR 5 were paved from Ellijay to Cherry Log. By October 1936, US 76/SR 2 were paved from Dalton to Chatsworth. At the end of the year, there were two small sections of US 76/SR 2 just west of Blairsville and just west of Clayton, that were paved. By the middle of January 1938, a very small section, in the vicinity of Lake Burton, was paved. The middle of the next year had the section of US 76/SR 2 from the Fanning–Union county line to Blairsville was paved. Later that year, a small section of US 76/SR 2, from just east of Lake Burton to Clayton, was paved.

1940s
In the beginning of 1940, the paved section near Lake Burton was expanded slightly. By October, US 76/SR 2 were paved from east of the location of the current SR 197 intersection to Clayton. At the end of the year, US 76/SR 2 were paved from Hiawassee to the approximate location of where the Appalachian Trail crosses the highway today. In 1946, US 76 was designated along SR 2 from Dalton to Chatsworth. By the middle of 1948, SR 2 was paved from Clayton to about halfway between there and the South Carolina state line. The beginning of the next year found US 76 was designated along the section of SR 3 from Ringgold to Dalton. SR 2 was moved to an alignment near the Tennessee state line, traveling through modern-day Varnell and Crandall. SR 52 took its place between Dalton and Ellijay (it already was concurrent with SR 3 from the Ringgold area to Dalton and SR 5 from Ellijay to Blue Ridge). The entire section of US 76/SR 52, from Chatsworth to Ellijay, was paved.

1950s to 1980s

By the end of 1950, US 76/SR 2 were paved from Hiawassee to just east of the Towns–Rabun county line. Also, SR 2 was paved from Clayton to the South Carolina state line. By the middle of 1954, the entire length of roadway, from Tennessee to South Carolina, was paved. 1957 found SR 282 built along the current path of US 76, but only from the Murray–Gilmer county line to Ellijay. By 1966, US 76 was designated along US 41/SR 3 from Tennessee to Dalton. In 1969, SR 282 was extended west to an intersection with US 411/SR 61 southeast of Ramhurst. In 1971, US 76/SR 52 were rerouted west of Chatsworth. Before, they bypassed Spring Place. Northwest of the town, they were routed south into town and entered Chatsworth farther south than it previously did. The former route was redesignated as SR 52 Connector. In 1981, US 76 was rerouted between Chatsworth and Ellijay. In Chatsworth, US 76 turned south-southeast, along US 411/SR 61. In Ramhurst, it turned east onto a slightly re-routed SR 282 and followed that route to Ellijay. In 1987, US 76/SR 2 between Hemp and Blairsville was routed on a farther-north, and more direct, path. In 1989, SR 515 was signed along US 76 from East Ellijay to northeast of Young Harris, as it is today.

Major intersections

See also
 
 
 Special routes of U.S. Route 76

References

External links

 
76
Transportation in Catoosa County, Georgia
Transportation in Whitfield County, Georgia
Transportation in Murray County, Georgia
Transportation in Gilmer County, Georgia
Transportation in Fannin County, Georgia
Transportation in Union County, Georgia
Transportation in Towns County, Georgia
Transportation in Rabun County, Georgia